Lukeville is a small unincorporated town on the Mexico–United States border in southern Pima County, Arizona, United States. It was named for World War I aviator Frank Luke, an Arizona native who was awarded a posthumous Medal of Honor.

Description
The community lies at Lukeville Port of Entry border crossing into Sonoyta, Sonora, Mexico. It is the terminus of State Route 85 and is located entirely within Organ Pipe Cactus National Monument.  There is a stop-over spot for buses that are bound for Phoenix and Tucson along with a post office and a duty-free shop.

Its population was approximately 35 at the 2000 census, 27 (77%) of whom were Hispanic or Latino.

A project to replace portions of the Mexico–United States barrier in this area began in 2019.

Climate
This area has a large amount of sunshine year round due to its stable descending air and high pressure.  According to the Köppen Climate Classification system, Lukeville has a desert climate, abbreviated "BWh" on climate maps.

See also

 Operation Diablo Express

References

External links
 

Organ Pipe Cactus National Monument
Populated places in the Sonoran Desert
Unincorporated communities in Arizona
Unincorporated communities in Pima County, Arizona